Saint-Michel (also known as Saint-Michel—Ahuntsic) was a federal electoral district in Quebec, Canada, that was represented in the House of Commons of Canada from 1968 to 1988.

This riding was created in 1966 from portions of Mercier and Papineau ridings. From 1966 to 1979 it encompassed the neighbourhood of Saint-Michel and the then independent city of Saint-Leonard. In 1979 its boundaries changed and now included the neighbourhood Ahuntsic while Saint-Leonard was redistributed into Saint-Leonard-Anjou. In 1983, it was renamed "Saint-Michel—Ahuntsic". It was abolished in 1987 when it was redistributed into Ahuntsic and Papineau—Saint-Michel ridings.

Members of Parliament

This riding elected the following Members of Parliament:

Election results

Saint-Michel, 1968–1984

Saint-Michel—Ahuntsic, 1984–1988

See also

 List of Canadian federal electoral districts
 Past Canadian electoral districts
 Saint-Michel

External links

Riding history from the Library of Parliament:
Saint-Michel (1966 - 1983)
Saint-Michel--Ahuntsic (1983 - 1987)

Former federal electoral districts of Quebec